Bayanmönkh (Rich eternal) is a sum (district) of Khentii Province in eastern Mongolia. In 2010, its population was 1,347.

References 

Districts of Khentii Province